Events in the year 1970 in Turkey.

Parliament
 14th Parliament of Turkey

Incumbents
President – Cevdet Sunay
Prime Minister – Süleyman Demirel 
Leader of the opposition – İsmet İnönü

Ruling party and the main opposition
  Ruling party – Justice Party  (AP) 
  Main opposition – Republican People's Party (CHP)

Cabinet
31st government of Turkey (up to 6 March 1970)  
32nd government of Turkey (from 6 March 1970)

Events
 26 January – Necmettin Erbakan founds National Order Party.
 31 January – Pro-Islamic National Order Party formed.
 27 March – Gediz earthquake
 31 May – Fenerbahçe wins the Turkish championship.
 15–16 June – Martial law proclaimed after demonstrations in Istanbul and Kocaeli.
 22 July – Turkey signs an agreement with the European Community.
 9 August – Devaluation
 15 October – Aeroflot Flight 244 hijacked from the Soviet Union to Trabzon
 25 October – Census (population 35,666,549)
 18 December – A group of former Justice Party members form the Democratic Party.

Births
14 January – Fazıl Say, musician
21 March – Cenk Uygur, Turkish-American youtuber
14 April – Emre Altuğ , singer and actor
3 July – Aşkın Nur Yengi, singer
 1 August Sibel Can, singer
10 October Şafak Sezer, actor

Deaths
14 January – Asım Gündüz (aged 90),  general 
11 February – Tahsin Yazıcı (aged 79), general, Korean War veteran
3 June – Orhan Kemal (aged 55), born Mehmet Reşat Öğütçü, novelist
29 November – Irfan Orga (aged 62), airman and author

Gallery

See also
 1969–70 1.Lig
 List of Turkish films of 1970

References

 
Years of the 20th century in Turkey
1970 in Europe
1970 in Asia
Turkey